The Bundesstraße 231 or B 231 is a German federal highway in North Rhine-Westphalia.

Route description 
The B 231 runs from Oberhausen, near CentrO. through the Essen district Borbeck and ends in the Essen Westviertel, leads ahead to the inner city.

History 
Until the year-end 2006, the route led to Duisburg. The formerly part between Duisburg-Wanheimerort (Grunewald) via Duisburg-Dümpten and Oberhausen-Alstaden to the current starting point has been downgraded to a road (in German: Landstraße) and now it has been renamed to Landstraße 1 (shortcut: L 1). The part between Frintrop and the Westviertel has a tram connection (Line 105) within.

See also
List of federal highways in Germany (in English)
List of federal highways in Germany (in German)

Roads in North Rhine-Westphalia
231